Lekići is a village in the municipality of Podgorica, Montenegro.

Demographics
According to the 2011 census, its population was 193.

References

Populated places in Podgorica Municipality